Thompson Adogbeji Salubi was a Nigerian diarist, historian and politician who was president of the Urhobo Progress Union for twenty years.  Salubi wrote manuscripts about the history of Western Niger Delta and he is an important reference for the history of Urhobo people during the beginning of the colonial period. Some of his writings were edited by Peter Ekeh and published as the book T.E.A. Salubi: Witness to British Colonial Rule in Urhoboland and Nigeria by the Urhobo Historical Society in 2008.

Life
Salubi was born in Western Urhobo land, his father was from Ovu in present day Ethiope East local government area of Delta State. Between 1917 and 1924, he attended schools in Ovu and Lagos, after finishing standard six in Lagos, he took a 14 day return journey back to Ovu through the delta creeks. His first work was teaching at Okpara waterside, on the side, he also did translation for a Yoruba preacher. He went back to Lagos and spent two years at baptist Academy, thereafter, Salubi joined colonial service in 1927 starting work as a trainee in the sanitary department of the Lagos Town Council. In 1930, he completed certification with the Royal Sanitary Institute and later became the man in charge of the sanitary inspector's office at Ebute Metta, one of the few African inspectors at the time who coordinated their own branches. In 1943, he transferred services to the Labour department where he spent his remaining civil service years before retiring as a deputy commissioner for Labour.

In 1963, Salubi was president of the Urhobo Progress Union, an association to protect the interest and support educational advancement of Urhobos. During the First Nigerian Republic, Salubi belonged to a few political groups. He was affiliated with NCNC but later co-founded the Midwest Democratic Front. Between 1964 and 1972, he served as a regional commissioner in various administrations and ministries.  After the Midwest region was carved out of the West, Salubi was appointed regional Minister of Works. During the administration of Samuel Ogbemudia, he was a commissioner of agriculture.

References

Nigerian politicians
Year of birth missing
Year of death missing